Veblungsnes is a village located in Rauma Municipality in Møre og Romsdal county, Norway. The village lies along Romsdal Fjord just across the mouth of the Rauma River from the town of Åndalsnes. The European route E136 highway runs through the village on its way from Åndalsnes southwest to the village of Innfjorden. Veblungsnes is home to the Grytten Church and the Setnesmoen parade ground.

References

Rauma, Norway
Villages in Møre og Romsdal